Laurel is an unincorporated community in Clermont County, in the U.S. state of Ohio.

History
Laurel was originally called Van Burenville, and under the latter name was laid out in 1837. A post office called Laurel was established in 1844, and remained in operation until 1907.

References

Unincorporated communities in Clermont County, Ohio
Unincorporated communities in Ohio